The 2019 FIBA U18 Women's European Championship was an international basketball competition held from 6 to 14 July  2019 in Sarajevo, Bosnia and Herzegovina. It was the 36th edition of the championship. 16 national teams from across Europe, composed of women aged 18 and under, competed in the tournament.

Venues

Participating teams
   (Runners-up, 2018 FIBA U18 Women's European Championship Division B)
 
   (Host)
 
 
 
 
 
   (Third place, 2018 FIBA U18 Women's European Championship Division B)
 
  
   (Winners, 2018 FIBA U18 Women's European Championship Division B)

First round
The first-round groups draw took place on 13 December 2018 in Belgrade, Serbia.

All times are local (UTC+2).

Group A
<onlyinclude>

Group B
<onlyinclude>

Group C
<onlyinclude>

Group D
<onlyinclude>

Final round

Championship bracket

5th place bracket

9th place bracket

13th place bracket

Round of 16

9th–16th place quarterfinals

Quarterfinals

13th–16th place semifinals

9th–12th place semifinals

5th–8th place semifinals

Semifinals

15th place game

13th place game

11th place game

9th place game

7th place game

5th place game

Bronze medal game

Final

Final standings

Awards

All-Tournament Team 
  Ilaria Panzera
  Réka Dombai
  Janelle Salaun
  Caterina Gilli
  Angelika Kiss

References

External links
FIBA official website

2019
2019–20 in European women's basketball
2019 in Bosnia and Herzegovina sport
International youth basketball competitions hosted by Bosnia and Herzegovina
Sports competitions in Sarajevo
2019 in youth sport
July 2019 sports events in Europe